1951 in Korea may refer to:
1951 in North Korea
1951 in South Korea